Vinz may refer to:

Vinz (singer), part of the duo Nico & Vinz, earlier known as Envy
Ryan Vinz, American video technician
Vinz (rapper), British-Albanian rapper
Vinz Clortho, the Keymaster of Gozer, fictional character in the film Ghostbusters

See also
Purim Vinz, a Jewish anniversary commemorating the return, in 1616, of the Jews to Frankfurt after a group led by Vincenz Fettmilch organized a pogrom and expelled them out of the city